Ioannis Topalidis (born 24 November 1962) is a Greek professional football manager and former player.

Playing career
Topalidis spent most of his football career in Germany where he played for clubs such as SpVgg Ludwigsburg, VfR Bürstadt and Starkenburgia Heppenheim in the German third Division.

Managerial career
Topalidis began his managerial career with Eintracht Esslingen in 1989 and went on to coach SC Geislingen, TSG Backnang and was assistant coach for Hertha BSC. Topalidis became assistant manager of the Greece national football team in 2001. He was brought in by German Otto Rehhagel and won with him the UEFA Euro 2004.

References

1962 births
Living people
Greek footballers
Greek football managers
VfR Bürstadt players
Greek expatriate sportspeople in Germany
SpVgg Ludwigsburg players
Greece national football team managers
Kavala F.C. managers
Association football midfielders
AEP Paphos FC managers
Greek expatriates in Cyprus
Expatriate football managers in Cyprus
Greek expatriate football managers
People from Kozani (regional unit)
Footballers from Western Macedonia